Manuel Morales (born December 28, 1987), is a Peruvian professional basketball player.  He currently plays for the Regatas Lima club of the Liga de Basket de Lima.

He represented Peru's national basketball team at the 2016 South American Basketball Championship, where he was his team's best three point shooter.

References

External links
 FIBA.com profile
 Latinbasket.com Profile

1987 births
Living people
Peruvian men's basketball players
Small forwards
Sportspeople from Lima
21st-century Peruvian people